The Trace is a 1994 Turkish thriller film directed by Yeşim Ustaoğlu. It was entered into the 19th Moscow International Film Festival.

Cast
 Derya Alabora
 Aytaç Arman as Kemal

References

External links
 

1994 films
1994 thriller films
1990s Turkish-language films
Films directed by Yeşim Ustaoğlu
Turkish thriller films